Vincent Montabonel (born 29 March 1977) is a French lightweight rower. He won a gold medal at the 1998 World Rowing Championships in Cologne with the lightweight men's coxless pair.

References

1977 births
Living people
French male rowers
World Rowing Championships medalists for France